Fuck 'Em All We've All Ready (Now) Won! is the second studio album by the American punk rock band False Alarm. It was recorded in 2001–2002 at Painted Sound Studios in Los Angeles, but released only in 2006 and re-released in Italy by Nicotine Records in 2009.

Track listing 
All tracks composed by Brent Alden and Dylan Maunder; except where noted.
 "Horrible Life" — 2:22	  
 "Vietnamese Baby" (David Johansen) — 3:38
 "Enemies" — 0:55
 "Youth Gone Mad" — 3:11
 "Tell Me Who I Am" — 3:08
 "No Choice" — 4:54	
 "My Destruction" — 3:14	
 "In My Mind" (Paul Kostabi) — 4:01	
 "Devil Devil" — 3:02
 "I Could Care Less" — 3:30
 "High Tension Wire" (Stiv Bators, Cheetah Chrome, Jimmy Zero) — 3:06
 "Day Is Night Brent" (Brent Alden, Dylan Maunder, George Tabb) — 2:08
 "Can’t See the Sun" — 2:10
 "I Don’t Want to Be Your Friend" — 2:59

Release history

Personnel 
False Alarm
 Dylan Maunder — lead guitar, lead vocals
 Art Chianello — drums
 Paul Kostabi — rhythm guitar
 Brent Alden — bass
Additional personnel 
 Cheetah Chrome — lead guitar (4–6, 9–11); lead vocals (11)
 Rick Wilder — lead vocals (2)
 De De Troit — lead vocals (8)
Technical
 Steven Bardo — engineer
 Dee Dee Ramone and Paul Kostabi — artwork

Reviews 

PunkBands.com
PunkGlobe.com
Ramones.ru (Russian)
SugarBuzzMagazine.com
Slums Off Hollywood Boulevard
Summer of Hate Punk Rock Zine

External links 
 Interpunk.com
 Nicotine Records
 Punkrockcds.com
 

2006 albums
False Alarm (band) albums